Scream Queens is an American satirical black comedy slasher television series that aired on Fox from September 22, 2015, to December 20, 2016. The series was created by Ryan Murphy, Brad Falchuk, and Ian Brennan and produced by Murphy, Falchuk, Brennan, and Alexis Martin Woodall, and by 20th Century Fox Television, Ryan Murphy Productions, Brad Falchuk Teley-vision, and Prospect Films. The first season stars an ensemble cast consisting of Emma Roberts, Skyler Samuels, Lea Michele, Glen Powell, Diego Boneta, Abigail Breslin, Keke Palmer, Oliver Hudson, Nasim Pedrad, Lucien Laviscount, Billie Lourd, and Jamie Lee Curtis, with Niecy Nash, Ariana Grande, and Nick Jonas in supporting roles. It takes place at the fictional Wallace University, and was filmed at Tulane University in New Orleans, Louisiana. It follows a sorority, Kappa Kappa Tau (KKT), which is targeted by a serial killer using the university's Red Devil mascot as a disguise.

On January 15, 2016, Fox renewed the series for a second season, which premiered on September 20, 2016. Roberts, Michele, Powell, Breslin, Palmer, Hudson, Lourd, Nash, and Curtis reprised their roles from the first season, while John Stamos, Taylor Lautner, James Earl III, and Kirstie Alley were added to the cast. Instead of a university, the second season was set in a hospital, and was produced in Los Angeles, California. The show was canceled on May 15, 2017, after two seasons.

In May 2020, Murphy confirmed that he is working on a third season of the series.

Plot
The first season focuses on the Kappa Kappa Tau sorority at Wallace University, led by Chanel Oberlin (Emma Roberts) and her fellow Chanels #2 (Ariana Grande), #3 (Billie Lourd), and #5 (Abigail Breslin), that is threatened by Dean Cathy Munsch (Jamie Lee Curtis). Events reignite a 20-year-old murder mystery, with the reemergence of the serial killer dressed as the Red Devil mascot, who begins targeting the sorority members.

The second season shows Cathy Munsch having opened a hospital after leaving the university business. She has taken an acquitted Chanel, Libby, and Sadie under her wing after the real Red Devil killer came clean. While handling different medical cases, Cathy and the Chanels end up encountering a new serial killer called the Green Meanie.

Cast and characters

Main

Introduced in season one
 Emma Roberts as Chanel Oberlin
 Skyler Samuels as Grace Gardner (season 1)
 Lea Michele as Hester Ulrich/Chanel #6
 Glen Powell as Chad Radwell (season 1; recurring season 2)
 Diego Boneta as Pete Martinez (season 1)
 Abigail Breslin as Libby Putney/Chanel #5
 Keke Palmer as Zayday Williams
 Oliver Hudson as Weston "Wes" Gardner (season 1; guest season 2)
 Nasim Pedrad as Gigi Caldwell/Jess Meyer (season 1)
 Lucien Laviscount as Earl Grey (season 1)
 Billie Lourd as Sadie Swenson/Chanel #3
 Jamie Lee Curtis as Dean/Dr. Cathy Munsch

Introduced in season two
 Kirstie Alley as Nurse Ingrid Hoffel (née Bean)
 Taylor Lautner as Dr. Cassidy Cascade 
 James Earl III as Chamberlain Jackson 
 John Stamos as Dr. Brock Holt

Recurring
 Niecy Nash as Denise Hemphill
 Riley Schmidt as Red Devil/Green Meanie

Season 1
 Ariana Grande as Sonya Herfmann/Chanel #2
 Nick Jonas as Boone Clemens
 Breezy Eslin as Jennifer 
 Jeanna Han as Sam 
 Aaron Rhodes as Rodger 
 Austin Rhodes as Dodger 
 Evan Paley as Caulfield Mount Herman
 Anna Grace Barlow as Bethany Stevens/Mary Mulligan 
 Grace Phipps as Mandy Greenwell 
 Jim Klock as Detective Chisolm 
 Jan Hoag as Ms. Agatha Bean 
 McKaley Miller as Sophia Doyle
 Anna Margaret as Coco Cohen
 Lo Graham as Co-Ed Girl
 Brianne Howey as Melanie Dorkus

Season 2
 Trilby Glover as Jane Hollis
 Jerry O'Connell as Dr. Mike 
 Laura Bell Bundy as Nurse Thomas 
 Andy Erikson as Marguerite Honeywell/Chanel #7 
 Riley McKenna Weinstein as Daria Janssen/Chanel #8
 Moira O'Neill as Addison/Chanel #9
 Dahlya Glick as Andrea/Chanel #10
 Kevin Bigley as Randal

Guest stars

Season 1
 Roger Bart as Mr. Herfmann
 Charisma Carpenter as Mrs. Herfman
 Jennifer Aspen as adult Mandy Greenwell
 Tavi Gevinson as Feather McCarthy
 Philip Casnoff as Steven Munsch
 Dan Hildebrand as Detective Baxter
 Anwan Glover as Truck Driver
 Chelsea Zhang as Sorority Girl
 Chad Michael Murray as Brad Radwell
 Alan Thicke as Tad Radwell
 Julia Duffy as Bunny Radwell
 Patrick Schwarzenegger as Thad Radwell
 Gary Grubbs as Mr. Swenson
 Faith Prince as Mrs. Swenson
 Rachele Brooke Smith as Muffy St. Pierre-Radwell
 Jerry Leggio as Wellington
 Wallace Langham as Mr. Putney
 Jean Louisa Kelly as Delight Ulrich
 Steven Culp as Clark Ulrich
 Lara Grice as Mrs. Putney
 GiGi Erneta as Anchor
 John McConnell as Bailiff

Season 2
 Cecily Strong as Catherine Hobart
 Brian Baumgartner as Richard
 Colton Haynes as Tyler
 Cheri Oteri as Sheila Baumgartner
 Alec Mapa as Lynn Johnstone
 Ivar Brogger as Mitch Mitchum
 Olivia May as Katy Perry
 Mary Birdsong as Penelope Hotchkiss
 Cathy Marks as Midge/Chanel #11
 August Emerson as Brandon Szathmary
 Helen Hong as Phlebotomist
 Marissa Jaret Winokur as Shelly
 Amy Okuda as Anna Plaisance
 Roy Fegan as Slade Hornborn
 Bill Oberst Jr. as Clark
 Brooke Shields as Dr. Scarlett Lovin
 Ajay Mehta as Dr. Arthur Annenburg

Episodes

Season 1 (2015)

Season 2 (2016)

Production

Development

On October 20, 2014, Fox Broadcasting Company announced that it had ordered a 15-episode season of Scream Queens (including a second season in the original contract), created by Ryan Murphy, Brad Falchuk and Ian Brennan who also co-created Glee, which was later reduced to 13 episodes. The series will be executive produced by Murphy, Falchuk, Brennan, and Dante Di Loreto. The series premiered in September 2015. Murphy has stated that every episode a cast member will be killed off, saying, "It's very much like Ten Little Indians. There's a real tune-in factor because it's like, Who's going to be picked off this week? And also who is the killer? Every episode, you get clues as to who the killer is going to be and then all of these clues accumulate." The series will not be completely anthological in nature with Murphy stating, "Whoever survives—and there will be people who will survive—they will go on next season to a new location and a new terror. Unlike [Murphy and Falchuk's other like series] American Horror Story, which completely reboots, this has some of the continuity in that some of the characters and some of the relationships continue into a new world." The first season's killer will not be revealed until the final episode. Murphy has announced that the second season will feature three Halloween episodes.

Falchuk shared insight on the decision making of who the killer(s) would be, saying, "We decided right at the beginning. We talked through what is it — Who is the killer? What is it? — so we would always know going forward. In that process, we've had moments where we're like, 'What if instead of this person, it's this person?' Then we talk it through, and we've always come back to our original plan." Further elaborating on the nature of a whodunit narrative Falchuk stated, "We're very careful to have somebody go through the script all the time and try to understand who was attacked, when they were attacked, why they were attacked, and if it's possible that we are eliminating anyone as a suspect by doing this. The answer always has to be no, because we know how fans are. They make big charts about who the killer is, and then someone figures it out. I think there's great fun in the whodunnit, but it's also, somebody's going to figure it out. By the end of episode one, somebody's going to figure it out, because that's what people do. I don't think it'll take anything away from anything."

Falchuk talked at length about the decision making processes as to who will die in each episode, "It's harder casting and directing actors you know you're going to have to kill off. Once you get on the set and you're working with them, they're sometimes so great that it's challenging." The creator continued, "...when we got to know the actress who played Deaf Taylor Swift, she was so funny that we got together and said, 'Is there a way we can not kill her and maybe kill someone else?' And it's like no, we love everybody, and it also sort of fit with the story, so we had to go forward with it." Speaking to the tricky horror/comedy nature of the show, Falchuk stated, "The way you find the balance is understanding that, when you're missing some ingredients, certain ingredients are super strong, and the flavor is so strong that if you use too much, it ruins the whole soup. Horror is something that is a really strong flavor, so just little drops of it is the best recipe." The series is a commentary on "youth culture and college culture", with characters like Dean Munsch and Wes Gardner providing the adult commentary. "He's connected in a way that it's harder for him to be objective about, because his daughter, Grace, is there. Then you have the dean, and she lives having seen this culture develop over the course of her years as an educator, and she's reacting to it."

In September 2015, it was revealed that scream queen Heather Langenkamp is behind the special effects for the series.

Casting

In December 2014, it was reported that Emma Roberts and Jamie Lee Curtis would be featured as series regulars. In January 2015, Lea Michele, Joe Manganiello, Keke Palmer, and Abigail Breslin joined the series' main cast, as well as actress/singer Ariana Grande in a recurring capacity. Later that month, The Hollywood Reporter confirmed that Nick Jonas would recur throughout the first season. In February 2015, newcomer Billie Lourd and Skyler Samuels joined the series' main cast. Later in the month, Niecy Nash joined the recurring cast as Denise, a kick-butt security guard; and British actor Lucien Laviscount, Diego Boneta and Glen Powell were confirmed as regulars.

In March 2015, Nasim Pedrad was cast as a series regular. On March 13, previously cast Manganiello was forced to depart the series, due to publicity obligations for his film Magic Mike XXL. Oliver Hudson was hired as his replacement. On June 24, it was announced that Charisma Carpenter and Roger Bart would portray Chanel #2's (Grande) parents. In August 2015, Philip Casnoff was cast as Cathy's (Curtis) husband. In September 2015, Murphy announced, through his Twitter feed, that Patrick Schwarzenegger had joined the cast. He will portray Chad's (Powell) younger brother, Thad. Chad's older brother, Brad, will be played by Chad Michael Murray; while Alan Thicke and Julia Duffy have been cast as Mr. and Mrs. Radwell.

John Stamos, Taylor Lautner, and Colton Haynes joined the second season. On July 28, 2016, it was announced that Jerry O'Connell and Laura Bell Bundy will have recurring roles.

Filming

The series began principal photography on March 12, 2015, in New Orleans, Louisiana. Exterior campus scenes were shot at Tulane University. The show completed filming of the pilot episode in April 2015, with filming for the remaining first season installments commencing in early June 2015. Murphy, Brennan, and Falchuk were said to be the first season's sole directors; however, this was later proven not to be the case.

Curtis filmed an intricate homage to her mother's, Janet Leigh, classic shower scene in Psycho. Falchuk spoke about being hesitant to include the scene, "I thought, 'Can I do this? Do I need to ask her?' So then I wrote it and then got a text from her very quickly after she read the script. Her text was, 'We need to do this shot-for-shot.' Then, typical Jamie Lee, she started sending me all the websites and Tumblrs that have each shot laid out and storyboarded." Curtis bought out a greeting card company that had the image of her mother screaming, and placed one near the monitor. She viewed the Psycho scene several times between takes, matching the smallest details, such as which hand reaches for the bar of soap, and twitches of the eye. "It's a big deal and I don't take it lightly," Falchuk concluded, "...that she went for it like that was very moving for me."

The second season saw production move from New Orleans, Louisiana, to Los Angeles, California; after scoring a significant tax credit. Principal photography commenced in July 2016.

Main title sequence
The title sequence for the series features Roberts, Michele, Samuels, Palmer, Boneta, Powell, Breslin, and Lourd in an homage to 80's horror flicks. An original song, "You Belong to Me" is performed by singer Heather Heywood, which was written by show composer Mac Quayle, Heywood, and executive producer Alexis Martin Woodall. The title sequence only appeared in the fifth episode "Pumpkin Patch", though it was trimmed down to under a minute due to time constraints.

Marketing
On February 13, 2015, Fox released the first teaser trailer for the series on YouTube. Another teaser followed on March 13, featuring Roberts, and another aired during the first-season finale of Empire, featuring Palmer. On April 9, 2015, another teaser was released featuring Roberts, and once again on April 27. Later that month, Entertainment Weekly released a series of exclusive posters. Exclusive poster art was found at Six Flags locations throughout the summer. On May 19, 2015, the first full-length trailer was released. On July 1, 2015, cast portraits were released.

Broadcast
The series had its world premiere at the 2015 Comic-Con in July. In late August, free screenings of the pilot along with two other new Fox pilots were held in select cities. In the United States, it premiered on Fox on September 22, 2015. In Canada, Scream Queens airs simultaneously with the U.S. on Citytv.

On October 26, 2015, the series premiered E4 in the United Kingdom and Ireland. After the season two hiatus, the show moved to a late night timeslot, airing Thursdays at Midnight. In Australia, the series debuted on Ten on September 23, 2015, before moving to its sister channel, Eleven, with episode two on the same day.

Following the acquisition of 21st Century Fox by Disney, Scream Queens was made available internationally on Disney+ under the dedicated streaming hub Star on February 23, 2021. In the United States, the series is available on Hulu.

On June 1, 2022, it was made available on the CW Seed following a licensing deal with Disney.

Reception

Ratings

Critical response
Scream Queens received mixed reviews from critics in its first season. On review aggregator Rotten Tomatoes, the first season has a 68% approval rating based on 74 reviews, with an average rating of 6.3/10. The site's critical consensus reads, "Too tasteless for mainstream viewers and too silly for horror enthusiasts, Scream Queens fails to satisfy." On Metacritic, the season was given a score of 59 out of 100, based on 33 critics, indicating "mixed or average reviews". IGN reviewer Terri Schwartz gave a very positive review of the two-episode premiere, giving it a 9.7 out of 10, stating "Ryan Murphy has worked his TV magic again with a killer start to Scream Queens. From the acting to the costuming to the writing, everything about this concept and execution works [and] offers up enough mystery and intrigue to keep even the biggest skeptic entertained." Ed Power of The Telegraph also gave the premiere a positive review, awarding it four out of five stars. Brian Lowry of Variety, remarked in his review of the finale, "Murphy's real genius stems from an ability to promote his shows through concept and casting, the tradeoff being that those qualities have a bad habit of trumping execution", earlier noting "The big reveal in the finale wasn't particularly revealing, mostly because the narrative had been such a madcap mess in the preceding weeks that any suspense had dissipated long ago."

The second season received more positive reviews from critics. On Rotten Tomatoes, all of which reviewed the premiere only, reporting an 83% approval rating with an average rating of 7.1/10, and provided no critical consensus. The average Nielsen viewership ratings for the second season were roughly half of that of the first season, including a 48% decrease in live viewership and a 51.2% decrease in "live + 7-day DVR" viewership. Orly Greenberg, from the Observer, gave a mixed review of the second-season premiere, complimenting the casting of John Stamos as a positive addition but noted problems in the overall execution, stating "season two feels just slightly stronger than the previous semi–disaster of a season last year ... Its tone is scattered [and] its acting is inconsistent at best." In her review of the finale, she stated "This season finale resolved nothing, mostly because there was nothing to resolve. This was honestly and truly the most anti-climactic season closer I've ever seen ... neither mysterious nor intriguing. Instead it was vaguely just ... present." Brian Moylan of Vulture remarked in his finale review that "nothing about this season made sense. [Scream Queens] at its best [is] a campy treat that doesn't need logic because it has smarts, sass, and plenty of bitchiness to keep everything humming. This season lacked all of that. It seemed like a lame retread of an idea that ran out of steam 15 episodes ago." He gave the finale two out of five stars.

Accolades

See also

American Crime Story, a true crime anthology produced by Falchuk and Murphy which airs on Fox sister channel FX
American Horror Story, a horror anthology produced by Falchuk and Murphy which airs on Fox sister channel FX
Feud, a dramatic period anthology produced by Falchuk and Murphy which airs on Fox sister channel FX

References

External links

 
 

 
2015 American television series debuts
2016 American television series endings
2010s American black comedy television series
2010s American college television series
2010s American horror comedy television series
2010s American LGBT-related comedy television series
2010s American mystery television series
2010s American satirical television series
English-language television shows
Fox Broadcasting Company original programming
Television series by 20th Century Fox Television
Television series created by Brad Falchuk
Television series created by Ryan Murphy (writer)
Television shows about death
Television shows filmed in New Orleans
Television shows set in New Orleans
Television shows set in Los Angeles
Television shows featuring audio description